Stephanocircidae is a family of fleas native to South America and Australia, where they are found on rodents.

Genera
 Subfamily Craneopsyllinae Wagner, 1939
 Tribe Barreropsyllini Jordan, 1953
 Genus Barreropsylla Jordan, 1953
 Tribe Craneopsyllini Wagner, 1939
 Genus Cleopsylla Rothschild, 1914
 Genus Craneopsylla Rothschild, 1911
 Genus Nonnapsylla Wagner, 1938
 Genus Plocopsylla Jordan, 1931
 Genus Sphinctopsylla Jordan, 1931
 Genus Tiarapsylla Wagner, 1937
 Subfamily Stephanocircinae Wagner, 1928
 Genus Coronapsylla Traub et Dunnet, 1973
 Genus Stephanocircus Skuse, 1893

References 
 Family STEPHANOCIRCIDOIDEA – FLEAS classification zin.ru

Fleas
Insects of South America
Insect families